Alessandro "Sandro" Gamba (born 3 June 1932) is an Italian former professional basketball player and coach. Gamba was a finalist for induction into the Naismith Memorial Basketball Hall of Fame in 2005, and was elected as a member in 2006. He was inducted in 2006 to the Italian Basketball Hall of Fame.

Playing career

Clubs career
During his club career, Gamba spent most of his career with Olimpia Milano, they won ten LBA championships (1951–1954, 1957–1960, 1962–1963). He finished his career with Milano 1958.

Italy national team
Gamba debuted with the Italy national team in 1952 and captained at the 1960 Summer Olympic Games.

Coaching career
Gamba retired from playing in 1965, and became a coach in the top-tier level Italian professional league (LBA) where he coached teams like Olimpia Milano (assistant coach, 1965–1973), Varese (1973–1977), Auxilium Torino (1977–1980), and Virtus Bologna (1985–1987). He led Varese to two LBA championships (1974 and 1977), and two FIBA European Champions Cup (EuroLeague) titles (1975 and 1976).

From 1979 to 1992, except for a hiatus in 1985–1987, Gamba was the head coach of the Italy national team, and led them to a silver medal at the Summer Olympic Games in 1980, 1984, 1988, and 1992. He also coached the national team at the EuroBasket seven times, winning a gold in 1983, a bronze in 1985, and a silver in 1991.

He was selected as a coach of the FIBA European Selection teams in 1991. He also worked as the coach of the "Rest of the World" team, at the Nike Hoop Summit.

See also 
 List of FIBA EuroBasket winning head coaches
 List of EuroLeague-winning head coaches

References

External links

FIBA Player Profile 1
FIBA Player Profile 2
FIBA Europe Player Profile
Basketball Hall of Fame Profile
Italian League Coach Profile 

1932 births
Living people
Auxilium Pallacanestro Torino coaches
Basketball players from Milan
Italian basketball coaches
Italian men's basketball players
Naismith Memorial Basketball Hall of Fame inductees
Basketball players at the 1960 Summer Olympics
Olimpia Milano players
Olympic basketball players of Italy
FIBA EuroBasket-winning coaches
EuroLeague-winning coaches
Pallacanestro Milano 1958 players
Pallacanestro Varese coaches
Virtus Bologna coaches
Small forwards